was a Japanese politician who served in the Diet (national legislature) for 39 years between 1969 and 2013. A native of Kobe, Hyogo, he attended Konan University as an undergraduate and University of California, Los Angeles as a graduate and received a master's degree in political science from Stanford University. During his time in the Diet he served as the head of the National Land Agency for six months in 1989–1990 and as Minister for Home Affairs for two months in 1994.

Political career
Ishii was elected to the House of Representatives as a member of the Liberal Democratic Party in the December 1969 general election as one of four representatives elected by the Hyōgo 1st district, after unsuccessfully contesting the same district in the January 1967 general election. He served five consecutive terms as a representative of the district before losing his seat in the December 1983 general election, finishing sixth in a contest for five seats and being replaced by Kazuhito Nagae of the Democratic Socialist Party.

Ishii was returned to the House of Representatives in the July 1986 general election, gaining the most votes in the Hyogo 1st district and regaining his seat from Nagae. Upon returning to the House he served three consecutive terms as one of five members for the Hyogo 1st district; he retained his seat at the July 1993 general election after leaving the Liberal Democractic Party and joining the Japan Renewal Party earlier that year. 1994 electoral reforms abolished the multi-member districts and replaced them with smaller single-member districts. In the same year the Renewal Party merged with other parties to form the New Frontier Party. Ishii won the first election in the new Hyogo 1st district at the October 1996 general election as a member of the Frontier Party. In 1998 he joined the short-lived Kokumin no Koe ("People's Voice") and Good Governance parties, which merged into the Democratic Party of Japan. Ishii retained the Hyogo 1st district seat at the June 2000 general election as a DPJ candidate. At the November 2003 general election Ishii was defeated by the LDP's Keisuke Sunada, the younger cousin of Shigetami Sunada with whom Ishii served five of his terms as representative of the old Hyogo 1st district. Despite the loss Ishii was able to retain a seat in the House as a member for the Kinki proportional representation block. At the September 2005 general election Ishii lost to the LDP's Masahito Moriyama and was also unsuccessful in gaining a PR seat. Ishii contested the July 2007 election for the House of Councillors, winning one of 48 seats in the national proportional representation block. He served one term before losing his seat in the July 2013 election.

Opposition to Soka Gakkai and the New Komeito Party 
According to the Democratic Party of Japan official website, during a 15 October 2008 meeting of the House of Councillors Budget Committee meeting, Ishii accused the opposing New Komeito Party of "operating in the shadows" and that he believed that the Nichiren Buddhist organization Soka Gakkai, who founded the Komeitō party in 1954, was "in charge of the election campaign" and was "using its facilities as part of the campaign machine". Ishii said the situation created a great problem for democracy in Japan and invited three former Komeito party members and Soka Gakkai Honorary President Daisaku Ikeda for an intensive deliberation on issue of politics.

References

External links 
 Official website  in Japanese.

1934 births
2022 deaths
Japan Renewal Party politicians
Members of the House of Representatives (Japan)
Members of the House of Councillors (Japan)
Ministers of Home Affairs of Japan
Critics of Sōka Gakkai
Konan University alumni
University of California, Los Angeles alumni
Stanford University alumni
People from Kobe
Democratic Party of Japan politicians
21st-century Japanese politicians
Politicians from Hyōgo Prefecture